Aida Marina Quilcué Vivas is a Colombian politician, indigenous and social leader of the Paez people. She belongs to the Regional Indigenous Council of Cauca (CRIC), she has been a UNESCO human rights and peace advisor. In 2022, she was elected to the Senate of the Republic by the Special Indigenous Constituency with the endorsement of her party, the Alternative Indigenous and Social Movement (MAIS).

Biography
In the 1990s, Quilcué was a health promoter for the Cauca Indigenous Association (AIC). In 2000, she was coordinator of the health program at the AIC and at the Regional Indigenous Council of Huila (CRIHU).

Between 2003 and 2009, Quilcué was appointed Senior Counselor of the Regional Indigenous Council of Cauca (CRIC), being one of the organizers of the 2008 Indigenous Minga in which thousands of indigenous people participated who marched to Bogotá in protest. In this mobilization, her husband Edwin Legarda died on 16 December in a hospital in Popayán after receiving three rifle shots fired by soldiers on the road that connects Inzá with Totoró, in the department of Cauca. During the trial and In subsequent years, Quilcué and her daughter have been victims of death threats and attacks.

Awards and recognition
In 2021, Quilcué won of the National Award for the Defense of Human Rights in Colombia in the category "Defense for a Whole Life".

References 

Date of birth missing (living people)
Living people
People from Cauca Department
21st-century Colombian politicians
Colombian people of indigenous peoples descent
Members of the Senate of Colombia
Colombian environmentalists
21st-century Colombian women politicians
Colombian women environmentalists
Year of birth missing (living people)